Rabindra Chanda (born 1 February 1932) is an Indian former cricketer. He played first-class cricket for Bengal and Railways.

See also
 List of Bengal cricketers

References

External links
 

1932 births
Possibly living people
Indian cricketers
Bengal cricketers
Railways cricketers
Cricketers from Dhaka